The 31st Seoul Music Awards is a award ceremony held on January 23, 2022. It was organized by Sports Seoul and broadcast through KBS Joy, U+Idol Live, U+Mobile TV, and Hello Live. The ceremony was hosted by Kim Sung-joo, Boom, and Kim Seol-hyun.

Criteria
All songs and albums that are eligible to be nominated must be released from January to December 2021.

Winners and nominees

Winners and nominees are listed in alphabetical order. Winners will be listed first and emphasized in bold.

The list of nominees for:
 U+Idol Live Best Artist Award were announced on December 6, 2021, through the Idol Live TV website.
 remaining categories were announced on December 4, 2021, through the official website.

The voting for:
 U+ Live Best Artist Award opened on Idol Live TV website on December 6, 2021, and closed on December 26, 2021.
 remaining categories opened on Seoul Music Awards mobile application on December 6, 2021, and closed on January 16, 2022.

Main awards

Genre-based awards

Other awards

Multiple awards
The following artist(s) received three or more awards:

Presenters
The list of presenters was announced on January 18, 2022.

Performers

Broadcast

References

External links
  (in English & Korean)

2022 in South Korean music
2022 music awards